Albert Nelson may refer to:

Albert Nelson (actor), American actor
Albert Nelson, 6th Earl Nelson (1890–1957), British peer
Al Nelson (born 1943), American football cornerback
Albert Nelson, designer of The Nelsonian
Albert Nelson (1923–1992), known by his stage name Albert King
Red Nelson (Albert Francis Nelson, 1886–1956), pitcher in Major League Baseball

See also
Alberta Nelson (1937–2006), American television and film actress
Bert Nelson (disambiguation)